The Neftçi 2020–21 season was Neftchi Baku's 29th Azerbaijan Premier League season. Neftchi will compete in the Azerbaijan Premier League and in the Azerbaijan Cup and Europa League.

Season overview
On 20 June, Jabir Amirli joined Neftçi from Keşla on a two-year contract.

On 8 July, Neftçi signed a new contract with Rahman Hajiyev until the summer of 2022, whilst also loaning him out to Keşla for the 2020–21 season.

On 10 July, Neftçi signed a new two-year contract with Agil Mammadov.

On 16 July, Neftçi announced the signing of Yusuf Lawal from Lokeren on a two-year contract, with the option of a third. Two days later, 18 July Sabir Bougrine joined Neftçi from F91 Dudelange on a two-year contract.

On 21 July, Turan Valizade moved on loan to Keşla for the season. The following day Rener Pavão joined Neftçi from Fortaleza on a two-year contract with the option of an additional year.

On 24 July, Neftçi announced the signing of Thallyson to a two-year contract.

On 28 July, Neftçi extended their contract with Namik Alaskarov for an additional year.

On 11 September, Neftçi announced the signing of Prince Ibara on a one-year loan deal from Beerschot.

On 19 September, Neftçi announced the signing of Mert Çelik on two-year long loan deal from İstanbul Başakşehir.

On 15 October, Neftçi signed Bruno Telushi from Kukësi on a contract until the end of the season.

On 26 December, Neftçi announced that Prince Ibara's loan from Beerschot had ended by mutual agreement.

On 4 January, Jabir Amirli joined Sumgayit on loan for the remainder of the season.

On 9 February, Neftçi announced the signing of Ahmed Ahmedov on loan from CSKA Sofia.

On 14 March, Neftçi announced that they had terminated the contract of Saman Nariman Jahan by mutual consent. The following day, Neftçi announced the signing of Keisuke Honda on a contract until the end of the season.

Squad

Out on loan

Transfers

In

Loans in

Loans out

Released

Friendlies

Competitions

Premier League

Results summary

Results by round

Results

League table

Azerbaijan Cup

UEFA Europa League

Qualifying rounds

Squad statistics

Appearances and goals

|-
|colspan="14"|Players away on loan:

|-
|colspan="14"|Players who left Neftçi during the season:

|}

Goal scorers

Clean sheets

Disciplinary record

References

External links 
 Official Website 

Neftçi PFK seasons
Azerbaijani football clubs 2020–21 season
Neftchi